Addison County is a county located in the U.S. state of Vermont. As of the 2020 census, the population was 37,363. Its shire town (county seat) is the town of Middlebury.

History
Iroquois settled in the county before Europeans arrived in 1609. French settlers in Crown Point, New York extended their settlements across Lake Champlain. A few individuals or families came up the lake from Canada and established themselves at Chimney Point in 1730.  In 1731, Fort Frederic was erected at Cross Point. In 1759, General Amherst occupied Cross Point and British settlers came in. The Battle of Bennington in Bennington, fought on August 16, 1777, brought a turning point for the American independence against British.

Addison County was established by act of the Legislature October 18, 1785, during the period of Vermont Republic. In 1791, Vermont joined the federal union after the original thirteen colonies. The main product of the county was wheat. In the 1820s farmers began to raise sheep. The Champlain Canal was opened on 1823, making it possible for ships to navigate from the Hudson River. In 1840, the county produced more wool than any other county in the United States.

When Vermont was admitted into the Union in 1791, there were 9,267 people living in Addison County. By 1830, the population had grown to 26,503 people.

In 2008, the federal government declared the county a disaster area after severe storms and flooding June 14–17.

Geography

It is the third-largest county in Vermont by total area.

Addison County is located in the western half of the state of Vermont and nearly in the center north and south; between 43° 50′ and 44° 10′ north latitude. The primary stream of the county is Otter Creek, which runs through the county from the south to the north.

Adjacent counties
 Chittenden County - north
 Washington County - northeast
 Orange County - east
 Windsor County - southeast
 Rutland County - south
 Washington County, New York - southwest
 Essex County, New York - west

National protected area
 Green Mountain National Forest (part)

Demographics

2000 census
At the 2000 census, there were 35,974 people, 13,068 households and 9,108 families living in the county. The population density was 47 per square mile (18/km2). There were 15,312 housing units at an average density of 20 per square mile (8/km2). The racial makeup of the county was 96.86% White, 0.54% Black or African American, 0.26% Native American, 0.73% Asian, 0.03% Pacific Islander, 0.29% from other races, and 1.29% from two or more races. 1.10% of the population were Hispanic or Latino of any race. 15.5% were of English, 12.7% American, 12.0% French, 10.8% French Canadian, 10.8% Irish and 6.7% German ancestry. 96.0% spoke English, 1.8% French and 1.2% Spanish as their first language.

There were 13,068 households, of which 34.40% had children under the age of 18 living with them, 57.40% were married couples living together, 8.30% had a female householder with no husband present, and 30.30% were non-families. 23.40% of all households were made up of individuals, and 8.90% had someone living alone who was 65 years of age or older. The average household size was 2.55 and the average family size was 3.02.

Age distribution was 24.90% under the age of 18, 12.50% from 18 to 24, 26.90% from 25 to 44, 24.30% from 45 to 64, and 11.30% who were 65 years of age or older.  The median age was 36 years. For every 100 females there were 97.70 males. For every 100 females age 18 and over, there were 95.40 males.

The median household income was $43,142, and the median family income was $49,351. Males had a median income of $31,836 versus $24,416 for females. The per capita income for the county was $19,539. About 5.10% of families and 8.60% of the population were below the poverty line, including 9.10% of those under age 18 and 8.00% of those age 65 or over.

For historical populations since 1900, see Historical U.S. Census totals for Addison County, Vermont

2010 census
As of the 2010 United States Census, there were 36,821 people, 14,084 households, and 9,340 families living in the county. The racial makeup of the county was 95.3% white, 1.4% Asian, 0.8% black or African American, 0.2% American Indian, 0.5% from other races, and 1.7% from two or more races. Those of Hispanic or Latino origin made up 1.9% of the population. In terms of ancestry, 18.1% were English, 17.2% were Irish, 12.0% were German, 7.5% were American, 7.2% were French Canadian, 5.9% were Italian, and 5.3% were Scottish.

Of the 14,084 households, 29.5% had children under the age of 18 living with them, 53.3% were married couples living together, 8.6% had a female householder with no husband present, 33.7% were non-families, and 25.5% of all households were made up of individuals. The average household size was 2.41 and the average family size was 2.88. The median age was 41.3 years.

The median income for a household in the county was $55,800 and the median income for a family was $67,721. Males had a median income of $43,643 versus $34,486 for females. The per capita income for the county was $26,599. About 5.7% of families and 11.3% of the population were below the poverty line, including 11.4% of those under age 18 and 5.8% of those age 65 or over.

Politics
In 1828, the county voted for National Republican Party candidate John Quincy Adams.

In 1832, the county voted for Anti-Masonic Party candidate William Wirt.

From William Henry Harrison in 1836 to Winfield Scott in 1852, the state would vote the Whig Party candidates.

From John C. Frémont in 1856 to Richard Nixon in 1960, the Republican Party would have a 104-year winning streak in the county.

In 1964, the county was won by Democratic Party incumbent President Lyndon B. Johnson, who became not only the first Democratic presidential candidate to win the county, but to win the state of Vermont entirely.

Following the Democrats victory in 1964, the county went back to voting for Republican candidates for another 16 year winning streak starting with Richard Nixon in 1968 and ending with Ronald Reagan in 1984, who became the last Republican presidential candidate to win the county.

In 1988, the county was won by Michael Dukakis and has been won by Democratic candidates ever since.

|}

Education

Addison County has the following high schools:
 Vergennes Union High School in Vergennes
 Mt. Abraham Union High School in Bristol
 Middlebury Union High School in Middlebury
 Middlebury Union Middle School in Middlebury
Addison County is also home to two institutions of higher learning, Middlebury College and the Community College of Vermont, both located in Middlebury

Transportation

Air
The Middlebury State Airport serves private aviation for Addison County. Commercial airlines are available to the north at Burlington International Airport in Chittenden County, and to the south at Rutland Southern Vermont Regional Airport in Rutland County.

Public transportation
Public bus service in Addison County is operated by Tri-Valley Transit (formerly ACTR). There is extensive bus service around Middlebury with connections to Vergennes, New Haven and Bristol, seasonal service to Middlebury Snow Bowl, as well as commuter buses to Burlington and Rutland operated in conjunction with Green Mountain Transit and the Marble Valley Regional Transit District, respectively.

Although the majority of rides are provided through the Shuttle Bus System, ACTR also operates a Dial-A-Ride System. This system enhances ACTR's ability to provide comprehensive transportation alternatives for all Addison County residents.

The Dial-A-Ride System includes programs that focus on specialized populations including elders, persons with disabilities, low-income families and individuals, as well as the visually impaired. Those eligible for Medicaid, Reach Up, are aged 60+ or with a disability may be eligible for free transportation.  Nearly 40 Volunteer Drivers work with ACTR to provide these rides.  Additional information about ACTR's transportation services are available at www.actr-vt.org.

Amtrak's daily Ethan Allen Express train serves two stations in Addison County: Middlebury and Ferrisburgh–Vergennes. The train makes major stops in Burlington, Rutland, Albany, and New York City. Begun in July 2022, this is the first regular passenger rail route in the county since the Rutland Railroad discontinued service in 1953.

Vermont Translines, an intercity bus carrier and interline partner with Greyhound and Amtrak, serves Addison County from Middlebury and Vergennes as well.

Major highways

  U.S. Route 7
  Vermont Route 12A
  Vermont Route 17
  Vermont Route 22A
  Vermont Route 23
  Vermont Route 30
  Vermont Route 53
   Vermont Route 73
  Vermont Route 74
  Vermont Route 100
  Vermont Route 116
  Vermont Route 125

Communities

City
 Vergennes

Towns

 Addison
 Bridport
 Bristol
 Cornwall
 Ferrisburgh
 Goshen
 Granville
 Hancock
 Leicester
 Lincoln
 Middlebury (shire town)
 Monkton
 New Haven
 Orwell
 Panton
 Ripton
 Salisbury
 Shoreham
 Starksboro
 Waltham
 Weybridge
 Whiting

Census-designated places
 Bristol
 East Middlebury
 Lincoln
 Middlebury
 New Haven
 South Lincoln

Other unincorporated communities
 Bread Loaf
 Chimney Point
 Satans Kingdom

See also
 Addison County Transit Resources
 Historical U.S. Census totals for Addison County, Vermont
 List of counties in Vermont
 List of towns in Vermont
 National Register of Historic Places listings in Addison County, Vermont
 USS Addison County (LST-31)

References

External links
 Addison County Chamber of Commerce
 National Register of Historic Places listing for Addison Co., Vermont
 History of Addison County - Edited by H. P. Smith.  D. Mason & Co., Publishers.  1886.  Hosted by the Middlebury College Library.

 
1785 establishments in Vermont
Populated places established in 1785